Fluorination by sulfur tetrafluoride produces organofluorine compounds from oxidized organic compounds, including alcohols, carbonyl compounds, alkyl halides, and others.

Sulfur tetrafluoride is a gaseous reagent that may be used to fluorinate a variety of organic functional groups, including carbonyl compounds, alcohols, and halides. Treatment of carbonyl compounds generally converts them into organofluorides of equivalent oxidation state: carboxylic acids are converted to trifluoromethyl compounds, ketones and aldehydes to difluorides, etc. The reaction has broad scope and is one of the few methods available for the direct introduction of fluorine at a specific site under relatively mild conditions.
(1)
Fluorinations of alcohols and halides are also possible with SF4. However, SF4 is gaseous at room temperature, and many transformations involving this reagent require elevated temperatures, making handling somewhat difficult. In addition, the reaction generates large amounts of hydrogen fluoride. These concerns have led to the development of safer, more robust fluorinating reagents, such as DAST (diethylaminosulfur trifluoride).

Mechanism and Stereochemistry

Prevailing Mechanism
The mechanism of fluorination by SF4 is uncertain and varies across substrates. Originally, alkoxysulfur trifluorides were proposed as intermediates; however, reactions of isolated alkoxysulfur trifluorides with hydrogen fluoride or heating have not provided the corresponding alkyl fluorides.
(2)
The mechanism of difluorination of vicinal diols has been well established, and proceeds by invertive attack at one hydroxyl group to give a fluorosulfite intermediate, which is converted to the difluorinated product after an additional treatment of SF4 and HF. The second fluorination proceeds with retention of configuration. Intramolecular delivery of fluoride is possible here and has been observed in some other cases of fluorination with SF4. SN1 mechanisms are operative for compounds that form carbocations easily, while SN2 reactions take place with less ionizable compounds.
(3)
Fluorination of carboxylic acids gives not only the expected trifluoromethyl compounds, but also α-tetrafluorinated ethers. A mechanism to account for both products has been proposed and experimentally supported. Intramolecular delivery of fluoride has been invoked to explain the formation of difluoromethyl cations. Attack of a molecule of acyl fluoride on a difluoromethyl cation, followed by neutralization with in situ generated bifluoride, leads to α-tetrafluorinated ether products. Direct reaction with bifluoride affords trifluoromethyl-containing products.
(4)

Scope and Limitations
Sulfur tetrafluoride can be used to replace a variety of functional groups with partially or fully fluorinated derivatives. Liquid hydrogen fluoride can be used as a solvent and catalyst with SF4 to selectively fluorinate alcohols. SF4's reactivity with carbonyl compounds is not enhanced in the presence of HF. Generally, only relatively acidic alcohols can be fluorinated efficiently with SF4, although amino alcohols appear to be an exception to this rule.
(5)
When vicinal diols are combined with SF4, difluorination occurs with inversion of configuration at one of the alcohols. This was demonstrated in the synthesis of meso-difluorosuccinate from (L)-tartrate and the synthesis of (D)- and (L)-difluorosuccinate from meso-tartrate.
(6)
Carbonyl compounds generally react with SF4 to yield geminal difluorides. Reaction times tend to be on the order of hours and yields are moderate.
(7)
Fluorination of lactones can provide heterocyclic fluorides, although ring opening has been observed for γ-butyrolactone. The six-membered lactide does not experience ring opening.
(8)
Fluorination opens epoxides to give either geminal or vicinal difluorides in most cases. Monoarylepoxides give geminal products with migration of the aryl group. Yields are low for sterically hindered di- and trisubstituted epoxides. Epoxides substituted with an ester group give vicinal difluorides via an alkoxysulfur trifluoride intermediate.
(9)
When amines are treated with SF4 and a base, iminosulfur difluorides result. Further reaction of these compounds with alkali metal fluorides leads to nitrile sulfides, which undergo [3+2] cycloaddition in the presence of dipolarophiles.
(10)
Carboxylic acids react with SF4 to afford trifluoromethyl compounds through the intermediacy of an acyl fluoride. Tetrafluoroalkyl ethers also form via reaction between difluoromethyl cation and acyl fluoride.
(11)
Sulfur tetrafluoride can be used to fluorinate polymers efficiently. This often has a profound effect on polymer properties—fluorination of polyvinyl alcohol, for instance, improves its resistance to strong acids and bases.

Synthetic Applications
The synthesis of a prostaglandin bearing a trifluoromethyl group at C-16 is based on an intermediate obtained by fluorination of a carboxylic acid with sulfur tetrafluoride.
(12)

Comparison with Other Methods
Modern fluorination methods have rendered sulfur tetrafluoride essentially obsolete. Use of the more easily handled reagent DAST (diethylaminosulfur trifluoride) is now preferred to SF4 for nucleophilic fluorination reactions. DAST is more selective in fluorinations of alcohols and promotes fewer rearrangements and eliminations in acid-sensitive substrates. The inconvenience of handling gaseous SF4 is a disadvantage of fluorinations employing this reagent. Additionally, acid-labile functionality cannot be present in the substrate if HF is used. Electrophilic fluorinating reagents, such as Selectfluor and N-fluorosulfonimides, complement the reactivity of SF4 and avoid these issues.
(13)

Experimental Conditions and Procedure

Typical Conditions
Sulfur tetrafluoride is a colorless gas at room temperature, although it boils at -38 °C. It is rapidly hydrolyzed in aqueous media and is corrosive and toxic; thus, reactions should be carried out in a well-ventilated fume hood with gloves and goggles. Sulfur tetrafluoride does not react with stainless steel, copper, or nickel. Ordinarily, fluorination reactions with SF4 are carried out in a stainless steel shaker apparatus. Gaseous reagents are introduced into the shaker by condensation and gaseous products are usually vented when the reaction is complete (unless the gaseous products are of interest, in which case they can be condensed into a separate vessel). Hydrogen fluoride can be separated from the desired products via pouring the reaction mixture into water followed by filtration. Solutions of calcium hydroxide can also be used in this context yielding harmless calcium fluoride.

Example Procedure
(14)
5-Hydroxyhistamine dihydrochloride (1700 mg, 3.5 mmol) was dissolved in 25 mL of anhydrous liquid HF and the solution was evaporated in a stream of dry nitrogen to remove HCl. The residue was redissolved in 40 mL of HF at -78 "C, treated with 2.3 mL of SF4 (40.3 mmol), and warmed to 0"C for 2.5 h. After recooling to -78 "C, an additional 2 mL of SF4 was condensed into the solution. The reactor was then immersed in an ice bath (ca. 1 L) which was allowed to warm to room temperature overnight.
The HF was then removed in a stream of N2, the residue was dissolved in 25 mL of 2.5 N HCl, and the solution was concentrated in vacuo to a gummy residue. This was applied to 150 mL of Dowex 50X8 and eluted with 200 mL of H2O, 400 mL of 1 N HCl, and ca. 1L of 2.5 N HCl. The ninhydrin positive fractions (2.5 N HCl) were concentrated to 500 mg of crystalline B-fluorohistamine dihydrochloride (71%): decomposition at 130 °C when inserted at this temperature;
60-MHz 1H NMR (D2O-DCl) δ 3.3-4.2 (broad multiplet, 2 H),
6.27 (doublet of four-line multiplets, 1 H, JHF = 47 Hz), 7.83 (m, 1 H,
JHF = 2 Hz), 9.0 (s, 1 H). Anal. Calc'd. for C5H10N3FCl2: C, 29.70; H,
4.95; N, 20.80; F, 9.40. Found: C, 29.69; H, 4.94; N, 20.51; F, 9.72.

References

Organic reactions